Émile Pereire (3 December 1800, Bordeaux - 5 January 1875, Paris) and his brother Isaac Pereire (25 November 1806, Bordeaux – 12 July 1880, Gretz-Armainvilliers) were major figures in the development of France's finance and infrastructure during the Second French Empire. The Pereire brothers challenged the dominance of the Rothschilds in continental European finance, known at the time as haute finance. Their attempt was temporarily successful, and even though it collapsed in the late 1860s, it contributed to a more developed and vibrant economic landscape. Like the Rothschilds, the Pereires were Jews, but unlike them, they were Sephardi of Portuguese origin.

Family

The brothers' grandfather was Jacob Rodrigues Pereira, one of the inventors of manual language for the deaf, who was born in Spain and established himself in France in 1741, where he became an interpreter for King Louis XV. Jacob Rodrigues Pereire (as he went by in French) married Miriam Lopès Dias, a Sephardic Jew from Bayonne, in Bordeaux in 1766. Their son Isaac (1770-1806) was conscripted during the French Revolutionary Wars and in 1800 married Rebecca Henriette Lopès Fonseca (1777-1827), daughter of Mardochée Lopès Fonseca and Esther de Daniel Delvaille, both also Sephardic Jews from Bayonne who had moved to Bordeaux in 1788. They had three male children, of whom the second, Mardochée Télèphe (1803-1820) died in young age.

In 1824 Emile Pereire married his cousin Herminie Rodrigues, whose mother was Henriette's sister. They had five surviving children: Fanny (born 1825), Cécile (born 1829), Claire (born 1834), Isaac-Emile (known as Emile II, born 1840) and Henry (born 1841).

In 1830 Isaac Pereire married Rachel Laurence Lopès Fonseca, a cousin of both him and Herminie; they had two sons, Eugène (born 1831) and Georges (born 1836). After Laurence's untimely death in 1837 he remarried with his niece Fanny in August 1841. Their three surviving children were Gustave (born 1846), Henriette (born 1853) and Jeanne (born 1856). Two other boys, Jules (1843) and Julien (1845) died in infancy, and a disabled one, Edouard, died in 1876 at age twenty-one.

Eugène, Emile II, Henry and Gustave all studied at École Centrale Paris. Several of the Pereire children married into established families of French haute finance and business elite. Claire in 1853 married Georges Thurneyssen, son of the Protestant banker and Pereire business partner Auguste Thurneyssen. Eugène in 1859 married Juliette Betzi Fould, daughter of Emile Fould, the Pereires' notary and himself a cousin of Achille Fould. Emile II in 1864 married Suzanne Chevalier, daughter of Michel Chevalier's brother Auguste. Henriette married , a businessman and politician.

Eugène Pereire, Isaac's elder son, led much of the remaining family business upon his father's death in 1880. His granddaughter Noémie Halphen married Maurice de Rothschild from the family of the Pereires' longstanding competitors. Gustave's son Alfred Pereire was a noted historian and bibliographer.

Business development

Emile and Isaac Pereire moved from Bordeaux to Paris in 1822 and 1823 respectively, where they initially lived in the house of their uncle , a banker. They became followers of Saint-Simonism. They kept their commitment to Saint-Simonian beliefs despite their break with Barthélemy Prosper Enfantin in the early 1830s.

The Pereire brothers founded a leading business conglomerate. Enterprises created or sponsored by the Pereires included:

 the  created in 1835, with service inaugurated in 1837, merged in 1855 into the Pereires' Compagnie des chemins de fer de l'Ouest, one of France's main railways companies, merged in 1908 into the Chemins de fer de l'État
 the Crédit Mobilier bank, founded in 1852 and subsequently the backbone of the Pereire group, taken over by the Banque de France in 1867 following the difficulties of the Compagnie Immobilière
 the Compagnie des chemins de fer du Midi, created in 1852, one of the major French railway companies until their nationalization into SNCF in 1938
 the Château Palmer winery in the Margaux AOC region near Bordeaux, purchased by the Pereires in 1853 and kept in the family until its sale in 1938
 the Compagnie Générale Transatlantique shipping company, created in 1855 as Compagnie Générale Maritime, one of the predecessor entities of CMA CGM
 The building later known as Louvre Saint-Honoré, with the Grand Hôtel du Louvre and retail mall Magasins du Louvre on its street level, created in 1855 and at the root of the Groupe du Louvre
 the Compagnie Immobilière de Paris, formed in 1856 and which in 1863 absorbed 's ailing Société des Ports de Marseille, itself taken over by the Banque de France together with the Crédit Mobilier in 1867 and eventually liquidated in 1881
 the fire and accident company La Confiance and the house insurance company La Paternelle, both controlled from 1859, both among the predecessor entities of Axa
 The Spanish insurance company El Fénix Español, created in 1864 and merged in 1879 to form , now part of Allianz

The Pereires were also instrumental in the creation and/or development of businesses they did not effectively control. These included: 
 the Comptoir national d'escompte de Paris, created in 1848, one of the main predecessor entities of BNP Paribas
 the Crédit Foncier de France, created in 1852, now part of Groupe BPCE
 the Darmstädter Bank für Handel und Industrie, created in 1853–54, forcibly merged into Dresdner Bank in 1931
 the Imperial Royal Austrian State Railways, created in 1854 and dismantled into national companies in 1918
 the  bank, created in Madrid in 1855-56 and reformed in 1902 as the Banco Español de Crédito, now part of Banco Santander
 the Banque Internationale à Luxembourg, created in 1856
 the  railway company in Russia, created in 1856
 the  railway company in Spain, created in 1858 and nationalized in 1941
 the Imperial Ottoman Bank, reformed in 1863, eventually merged in 2001 into Garanti Bank
 the Crédit Foncier d'Autriche, created in 1864

The Pereires also sponsored coal mining developments in Lorraine and Northern France.

Politics and media

The Pereires were deeply involved in French politics. Emile Pereire was member of Parliament (député) for the département of Gironde between 1863 and 1869. Isaac was similarly député for the Pyrénées-Orientales between 1863 and 1869, and for the Aude in 1869–1870. Isaac's son Eugène was also a député in the Tarn during the same period.

They also maintained a lifelong involvement in public debates through the media. In the 1820s Emile wrote regularly in Le Globe and from 1830, in Le National. In November 1871, Isaac acquired the conservative newspaper La Liberté from Émile de Girardin, and heavily influenced its editorial line in the later 1870s.

Downfall

In the mid-1860s, the Pereires' alliances in the haute finance began to fray. In 1866–7, the Pereire group underwent a severe crisis largely triggered by the burden of their developments in Marseille. The Pereires were forced to relinquished control of the Crédit Mobilier on 14 September 1867, at the demand of the Banque de France. Even so, they kept some of their wealth and properties, but had to face numerous lawsuits in the ensuing years and in 1872 were compelled to sell their art collections.

In any case, the Pereires' heyday came to an end with the demise of the Second Empire, with which they had been deeply associated. One of the Second Empire's key political protagonists, Persigny, would thus write in his memoirs:

Family properties

In 1852 the Pereires bought a vast estate in Gretz-Armainvilliers and commissioned their favorite architect  to build a palatial country house there in the early 1860s, the Château d'Armaivilliers, to rival the Rothschilds' nearby Château de Ferrières; it was bombed by mistake by the US Air Force in 1944 and demolished in 1950.

In 1854 they purchased the hôtel particulier on 15 Place Vendôme to make it the headquarters of the Crédit Mobilier, and kept it as such until 1867. The same building was transformed into a luxury hotel in 1898 by César Ritz and is now the Hôtel Ritz Paris.

In 1855 they acquired their urban mansion, the Hotel Pereire on 35-37 rue du Faubourg Saint-Honoré, initially built in 1713, and had it extensively renovated until 1859, also by Armand. That property was purchased by the British government in 1947 and is now the Embassy of the United Kingdom in Paris.

Their villa in Arcachon, built in 1863–1854 in their real estate development there, was demolished in 1959.

Legacy

The Pereires were active in real estate development and created some of the most iconic urban landscapes of the era.

The  in Paris, above the Pereires’ , was given their name in 1863, an extremely rare distinction for living individuals. The nearby  was called Place Pereire until 1973. In the same neighborhood, the Pereire Metro Station and Pereire–Levallois RER station also carry their name. Other public spaces bearing the Pereires' name are in Arcachon (Plage Pereire, avenue du Parc Pereire, allée Emile Pereire), Bayonne (place Pereire), Bordeaux (rue Emile Pereire), Rueil-Malmaison (rue Pereire), and Saint-Germain-en-Laye (rue Pereire). The former  in Asnières-sur-Seine has been renamed after native son Henri Barbusse.

Gallery

See also

 Rothschild family
 Compagnie du chemin de fer Grand-Central de France
 Crédit Mobilier of America scandal

Notes

Further reading
 Kurt Grunwald,  "Europe's Railways and Jewish Enterprise: German Jews as Pioneers of Railway Promotion." Leo Baeck Institute Yearbook 12.1 (1967): 163–209, on Rothschild and the Pereire brothers.

External links

Pereire family
French financiers
Jewish French history
Saint-Simonists
Sephardi Jews topics
Sibling duos
French people of Portuguese-Jewish descent
Compagnie Générale Transatlantique
19th-century Sephardi Jews